Siloam most often refers to the ancient site of Siloam in Jerusalem. Articles directly related to Siloam in Jerusalem include:
Pool of Siloam
Siloam inscription
Siloam tunnel
Tower of Siloam

Siloam may also refer to:

Places
In the United States
Siloam, Colorado
Siloam, Georgia
Siloam, Illinois
Siloam, New Jersey
Siloam, North Carolina
Siloam Township, Surry County, North Carolina
Siloam, a hamlet in the town of Smithfield, New York

Elsewhere
Siloam, Ontario, Canada

Cemeteries 
Siloam Cemetery in New Jersey, United States
Siloam, a section of  Cemetery of the Evergreens in Brooklyn, NY

Schools
Siloam School (Charlotte, North Carolina), United States
Siloam School (Eastover, South Carolina), United States

Other uses
Siloam Baptist Church in Alabama, United States
Siloam daylilies, a type of flower

See also
Siloam Springs (disambiguation)